Tenny Wright (1885–1971) was an American stuntman and film director. From 1929 he worked for Warner Brothers, and in 1934 was promoted to  production manager where he "became an integral part of the moviemaking process".

Selected filmography

Director
 The Fightin' Comeback (1927)
 Hoof Marks (1927)
 The Big Stampede (1932)
 The Telegraph Trail (1933)

Assistant director
 Milestones (1920)
 The Broken Gate (1920)
 Driftwood (1928)
 Nothing to Wear (1928)
 The Faker (1929)
 The Lone Wolf's Daughter (1929)
 Behind Closed Doors (1929)
 The Donovan Affair (1929)
 The Flying Marine (1929)
 Manhattan Parade (1931)

References

Bibliography 
 Alan K. Rode. Michael Curtiz: A Life in Film. University Press of Kentucky, 2017.

External links 
 

1885 births
1971 deaths
American film directors
People from Brooklyn